Sinan County (Sinan-gun) is a county in South Jeolla Province, South Korea. The county consists of 111 inhabited islands and 719 uninhabited islands. The number of islands in this county accounts for 25% of all islands in South Korea.

Big islands among them are Anjwado (45.2 km2), Aphaedo (44.3 km2), Bigeumdo (43.1 km2), Dochodo (40.3 km2), Imjado (43.2 km2), Amtaedo (38.7 km2), Jeungdo (37.2 km2), Jangsando (24.3 km2), Haui-do (16.1 km2), and Heuksando (19.7 km2). The sea area is a continental shelf with less than 15 meter in depth. Sinan County is known for its specialities - Skate (fish) and Cheonilyeom (천일염, a Korean type of sea salt).

In 2014, enslaveries on Sinan County's salt farms were discovered.

Administrative Divisions

Sinan County has two eup and twelve myeon.

Islands 
 Anjwado (안좌도, 安佐島): 45.2 km2
 Aphaedo (압해도, 押海島): 44.3 km2
 Bigeumdo (비금도, 飛禽島): 43.1 km2
 Dochodo (도초도, 都草島): 40.3 km2
 Imjado (임자도, 荏子島): 43.2 km2
 Amtaedo (암태도, 岩泰島): 38.7 km2
 Jeungdo (증도, 曾島): 37.2 km2
 Jangsando (장산도, 長山島): 24.3 km2
 Heuksando (흑산도, 黑山島): 19.7 km2
 Hauido (하의도, 荷衣島): 16.1 km2
 Gageodo (가거도, 可居島): 9.2 km2
 Hongdo (홍도, 紅島): 6.47 km2

Climate

Notable people from Sinan County
 Kim Daejung (Hangul: 김대중), Former president of South Korea (born in Hauido)
 Lee Sedol (Hangul: 이세돌), South Korean former professional Go player of 9 dan rank (born in Bigeumdo)
 Whanki Kim (Hangul: 김환기), South Korean pioneering abstract artist (born in Anjwado)
 Jinwoo (Real Name: Kim Jin-woo, Hangul: 김진우), singer, dancer, model, actor and K-pop idol, member of K-pop boygroup WINNER (born in Imjado)

Twin towns – sister cities
Sinan is twinned with:

  Gangnam-gu, South Korea  
  Mapo-gu, South Korea  
  Nowon-gu, South Korea  
  Ongjin, South Korea  
  Gyeongsan, South Korea  
  Gunpo, South Korea
  Dawa, China

See also 
 Geography of South Korea
 Jeolla
 Shinan ship
 Slavery on salt farms in Sinan County

References

External links 
 County government home page

 
Counties of South Jeolla Province